Mount Ubique is an Antarctican peak, 935 m in height, standing 4 nautical miles (7 km) south of Hermitage Peak in the Surveyors Range. It was named by the New Zealand Geological Survey Antarctic Expedition (NZGSAE) (1960–61) for the Royal Engineer's motto, meaning "everywhere."

Mountains of the Ross Dependency
Shackleton Coast